Gerd Cintl (11 December 1938 – 26 December 2017) was a West German rower who competed for the United Team of Germany in the 1960 Summer Olympics.

He was born in Düsseldorf in 1938. At the 1958 European Rowing Championships in Poznań, he won silver in the coxless pair with Horst Effertz. At the 1959 European Rowing Championships in Mâcon, he won gold with the coxed four. In 1960 he was a crew member of the German boat which won the gold medal at the Summer Olympics in the coxed four event. He died on 26 December 2017 in Düsseldorf at the age of 79.

References

1938 births
2017 deaths
Olympic rowers of the United Team of Germany
Rowers at the 1960 Summer Olympics
Olympic gold medalists for the United Team of Germany
Sportspeople from Düsseldorf
Olympic medalists in rowing
West German male rowers
Medalists at the 1960 Summer Olympics
European Rowing Championships medalists